Thomas Battle Turley (April 5, 1845July 1, 1910) was a Tennessee attorney who served as a Democratic United States Senator from 1897 to 1901.

Biography
Turley was born in Memphis and attended public schools and was a private in the Confederate Army throughout the Civil War, spending part of that conflict as a prisoner of war.  Upon its conclusion he attended the University of Virginia law school in Charlottesville, Virginia, completing his studies in 1867.  In 1870 he was admitted to the Tennessee bar and began practicing in Memphis.  A prominent attorney, upon the death in office of Senator Isham G. Harris, Turley was appointed by governor of Tennessee Robert L. Taylor to the vacancy.  He was subsequently elected to the balance of the term by the Tennessee General Assembly.

Turley declined to stand for any further service in the Senate once the balance of the term to which Harris had initially been elected had expired, serving in the Senate from July 20, 1897 to March 3, 1901.  He returned to his Memphis law practice until shortly before his death in 1910.  He was buried at Elmwood Cemetery in Memphis, the final resting place of many West Tennessee political figures.

External links 
 Tennessee Encyclopedia of History and Culture

References 

1845 births
1910 deaths
Democratic Party United States senators from Tennessee
Tennessee Democrats
19th-century American politicians
Politicians from Memphis, Tennessee